Temel Karamollaoğlu was nominated as the candidate of the Felicity Party (SP) on 6 May 2018, after he had successfully collected the 100,000 signatures required for minor party candidates to gain ballot access. Karamollaoğlu's campaign adopted the slogan "Türkiye'ye Bilge Başkan" (A Wise Leader to Turkey).

Program 

Defending “No” for the 2017 Turkish constitutional referendum
18 proposed amendments to the Constitution of Turkey(Full details)
 Rejection of joining the European Union
End of military ties with Israel and the United States 
 Turkey must adapt its military and foreign policy stance to meet what it argues are increasing threats coming from the West to all Muslim countries
 Turkey should use and protect Erbakan's ideas and philosophy.

Foreign policy 

On European Union–Turkey relations, Karamollaoğlu argues that Turkey as a Muslim majority country would never be allowed membership in the EU. He suggests negotiating a privileged partnership with the EU on issues such as trade, investments, travel arrangements, foreign relations and on other political issues similar to that of Norway, or the status Britain is trying to secure.

Election Result

Party Representation

References 

2018 Turkish general election
Karamollaoğlu